Louis Joxe (16 September 1901 – 6 April 1991) was a French statesman, judge, and politician. He was born in Bourg-la-Reine, Hauts-de-Seine.

Career
Joxe, along with René Capitant, the resistance organization Combat-Algérie, the only branch of Combat outside of metropolitan France.
 Ambassador of France to the USSR (1952–1955)
 Ambassador of France to the Federal Republic of Germany (-July 1956)
 Secretary General
 Minister of National Education (from 15 January 1960 to 23 November 1960 and from 15 October 1962 to 28 November 1962)
 Minister of Algerian Affairs (1960–1962) - signed the Évian Accords
 Minister of Administrative Reforms (1962–1967)
 Minister of Justice (6 April 1967 to 30 May 1968)
 Deputy of Rhône (1967–1977)
 Judge of the Constitutional Council of France

Personal life
He was married to Françoise-Hélène Halévy and was the father of the politician Pierre Joxe. Louis Joxe died in 1991, aged 89, in Paris.

References

Bibliography 

 

1901 births
1991 deaths
People from Bourg-la-Reine
Politicians from Île-de-France
Union of Democrats for the Republic politicians
French Ministers of National Education
French Ministers of Justice
Deputies of the 3rd National Assembly of the French Fifth Republic
Deputies of the 4th National Assembly of the French Fifth Republic
Deputies of the 5th National Assembly of the French Fifth Republic
Ambassadors of France to the Soviet Union
Ambassadors of France to West Germany
French people of the Algerian War
Members of the Académie des sciences morales et politiques
Honorary Knights Commander of the Order of the British Empire